The London Underground A60 and A62 Stock, commonly referred to as A Stock, was a type of sub-surface rolling stock which operated on the Metropolitan line of the London Underground from 12 June 1961 to 26 September 2012, and on the East London line from 1977 until 22 December 2007, when it closed to be converted into London Overground (except in 1986, when one-man operation conversion of the fleet took place).

The stock was built in two batches (A60 and A62) by Cravens of Sheffield in the early 1960s, and replaced all other trains on the line.

At the time of its withdrawal in September 2012, the stock was the oldest on the Underground, having been in service for over 50 years. It was the only stock to have luggage racks, umbrella hooks and separate power and braking controls, and the last stock not to feature any automated announcements.

Development and introduction 

The project was delayed by World War II and lack of funds during the austerity period after the war. In 1946 two experimental trailers similar in exterior appearance to the production trains were built using underframes from T Stock, but they were scrapped when the trials concluded. Graff-Baker died in 1952, before the trains were finally built.

The first units, 5004 and 5008, entered service to Watford in June 1961. The Amersham/Chesham services began later that year. London Transport later ordered 27 A62 Stock trains; these were introduced between 1961 and 1963 to replace F and P Stocks on the  service. By December 1963, the roll-out was complete.

The trains were designated as A Stock to mark the electrification of the Metropolitan line to Amersham. Four-car units were used on the East London line (then a branch of the Metropolitan line) from June 1977 to April 1985, May 1987 to 24 March 1995 and 25 March 1998 to 22 December 2007, when the line closed to become part of the London Overground network.

Design 

The stock was a compromise between the needs of longer-distance "outer suburban" passengers on the outer reaches of the line and short-distance "urban" passengers over the heavily used Circle and Hammersmith & City lines. For this reason, the trailer cars have three sets of doors per car.

A distinctive feature was the use of transverse seating only, uncommon on the Underground. This is because it was designed for journeys which might last over an hour. Most of the seating was of the high-capacity transverse 3 + 2 arrangement. Four tip-up seats were provided at the rear of the driving motor. Despite each 8-car train seating 448 passengers, the stock provided fewer seats than the locomotive-hauled and T stock trains that they replaced, but more seats than the S Stock which started to replace them on 31 July 2010. The stock had luggage racks and umbrella hooks, the only Underground stock to have these features, despite their presence on most contemporary British Rail stock. The A stock were the last subsurface trains built with headlights positioned on the left side of the cab giving them an asymmetrical appearance. They also had three tail lights positioned underneath the cab, although one was removed during refurbishment.

A60 and A62 stocks were nearly identical in appearance. The most significant differences were the border around the destination window on A62 motor cars and the make of compressor under the trailer cars: A60 stock used the Westinghouse DHC 5A, A62 cars the Reavell TBC 38Z.

At , they were the Underground's widest trains.
The stock was refurbished between 1994 and 1997 by Adtranz (now Bombardier) in Derby. Car end windows were installed, the seating was reupholstered, and the livery was updated. At the time of refurbishment, the Metropolitan line had a low priority for receiving new trains.

Operation 

Each unit consisted of four cars: two powered driving motors at each end and two non-powered trailers in between. Each unit was further divided into two semi-permanently-coupled sets, a driving motor and trailer. In service, trains consisted of one or two four-car units coupled together.

To avoid hauling under-utilised carriages, eight-car trains were divided into their component four-car units at the end of the peak hours, with one unit often stabled. At the start of the peak hours, this unit would be coupled to another single unit to create a longer train. Although this practice was discontinued across the Underground network at the introduction of the A60 and A62 Stocks, their capabilities of carrying shorter units continued the operation. In June 1962, four-car trains began to run on the Metropolitan line. Decouplings were normally scheduled at Uxbridge or Watford in the platforms, and at Amersham in the sidings.

The practice was discontinued after the 1980 summer season; with exception for the Chalfont & Latimer–Chesham shuttle, which was always operated by a single four-car unit; as it had become an operational nuisance. Uncoupling was usually cancelled during each winter as it was hazardous in leaf-fall and icy conditions. This also greatly simplified subsequent rolling stock modifications.

Other areas of operation 
In addition to the Metropolitan line, A Stock was permitted to traverse the following sections, subject to the following restrictions:

Roster 

Cars had a four-digit number. The first digit identified the type of car (driver or trailer), the last three digits the set (000 to 231).

In further detail:

^ operational DM
† Renumbered
+ Replaced/formed with a renumbered car

Renumberings:
a.  5034 and 5008 swapped numbers in July 1985; new 5008 and 6008 became set 5234-6234 in September 1994, 5034 preserved at the London Transport Museum, Acton.
b.  set 5009-6009 renumbered 5235-6235 in September 1994.
c.  set 5028-6028 renumbered 5232-6232 in June 1985.
d.  5036 renumbered 5116 in April 1993 (original 5116 scrapped in 1987 – collision at Kilburn, December 1984)
e.  set 5117-6117 renumbered 5233-6233 in August 1985; set 5037-6037 renumbered 5117-6117 in April 1993.
f.  5208 renumbered 5218 in August 1992 (original 5218 scrapped in 1994 – experimental suspension)
g.  5209 renumbered 5121 in March 1993 (original 5121 scrapped in 1994 – collision at Neasden depot, October 1986)
Converted works vehicles:
s.  Sandite dispenser car.
Withdrawals:
1.  
2.

Withdrawal 

A60 Stock reached 50 years of service on 12 June 2011. The age of the stock made spare parts more difficult to obtain and vehicles had to be cannibalised to keep the rest of the stock in operation.

S8 Stock replaced the stock, with the first unit introduced on 31 July 2010. This is similar to the S7 Stock for the District, Circle and Hammersmith & City lines; the main differences are the layout and number of seats and the provision of two sand hoppers for each rail due to the different conditions at the country end of the line. On 9 October 2010, the first eight cars of A Stock were sent for scrap, units 5197 and 5173. Both units had been out of service for several months after suffering from technical faults. Main withdrawal began on 20 January 2011, with units 5006+5179 being sent to the CF Booths of Rotherham for scrapping. 

In February 2012, the London Transport Museum began offering luggage racks from withdrawn A Stock for sale.

The last train ran in passenger service on 26 September 2012, formed of 5034 + 5062. The same train was used on 29 September 2012 for the final ticket-only railtour, organised by the London Transport Museum. It ran from Moorgate along the entire Metropolitan line, including Watford, Amersham, Aldgate, Uxbridge, Chesham and the Watford North curve. The tour ended at Wembley Park: on the final stretch from Finchley Road, the train was unofficially recorded at 74 mph. One of the driving motor cars, 5034, was part of the first (as 5008) and also the last A Stock train, giving it a life of over 51 years. It was sent to Northwood sidings on 8 October 2012 and loaded onto lorries for disposal. The historical age and significance of No.5034 saw it taken to the Acton Museum Depot for preservation but vehicle 5062 was scrapped.

The stock survived in engineering use as a Rail Adhesion Train until March 2018, when it too was scrapped, giving the stock a total life of 57 years. It had been last used in December 2017, when it had developed a fault and repairs were deemed unnecessary, as it was planned to be scrapped after the end of the year anyway, being replaced by a D78 stock unit.

The night of 24 May 2018 was the final time an A stock unit ran under its own power on the London Underground network. Set 5234/6234/6235/5235 worked train 710 from Neasden Depot to Ealing Common Depot. The set was subsequently removed from the adjacent London Transport Museum depot at Acton Town by road for disposal on 17 and 18 July 2018.

The stock outlasted many former British Rail EMUs: the Scottish Class 303 managed 43 years, the Class 309 Clacton Express units 38 years and British Rail Class 312 only 28 years. The former Southern Region 4CIG and 4CEP managed 46 and 49 years respectively. The stock was one of Britain's longest-serving types of train, although falling short of the service length of the ex-1938 Stock, which were still in use on the Isle of Wight 81 years after construction at the time of their withdrawal in 2021, the Class 487 units which pushed through to just under 53 years, or the 81 years of Glasgow Subway rolling stock between 1896 and 1977. A Stock may be outlasted by the Bakerloo line 1972 Stock.

Citations

Further reading

External links 

 A60/A62 stock - SQUAREWHEELS.org.uk

A60
Train-related introductions in 1961
Cravens multiple units